George Henry Stockman (3 July 1833 - 30 June 1912) was a first lieutenant in the United States Army who was awarded the Medal of Honor for gallantry during the American Civil War. He was awarded the medal on 9 July 1894 for actions performed at the Siege of Vicksburg on 22 May 1863.

Personal life 
Stockman was born in Muenden, Germany on 3 July 1833. He died on 30 June 1912 and was buried in West Laurel Hill Cemetery in Bala-Cynwyd, Pennsylvania.

Military service 
Stockman enlisted in the Army as a first lieutenant on 1 June 1861 in Chicago, Illinois and was assigned to G Company of the 6th Missouri Infantry. During the course of his enlistment, he was transferred to Company C of the same unit. On 22 May 1863, at the Siege of Vicksburg in Mississippi, Stockman volunteered to participate in an extremely dangerous charge on Confederate positions to the south of Vicksburg. Along with 150 other volunteers, whose job was to build a bridge over a ditch dug by the Confederates, Stockman held his ground under heavy gun and cannon fire from morning until nightfall in circumstances where 85 percent of the men were killed or seriously wounded.

Stockman's Medal of Honor citation reads:

Stockman was honorably discharged from the Army on 7 June 1864.

References 

United States Army Medal of Honor recipients
American Civil War recipients of the Medal of Honor
1833 births
1912 deaths